Kerry Bee (born 28 September 1974) is a South African former field hockey player who competed in the 2000 Summer Olympics and in the 2004 Summer Olympics.

References

External links

1974 births
Living people
South African female field hockey players
Olympic field hockey players of South Africa
Field hockey players at the 2000 Summer Olympics
Field hockey players at the 2004 Summer Olympics
Field hockey players at the 1998 Commonwealth Games
Field hockey players at the 2002 Commonwealth Games
Commonwealth Games competitors for South Africa